Mirza Abolfazl Attar. Z "Adin Attar" (born September 23, 1968) is an Iranian film director, actor, screenwriter and film editor.

Early life
Adin Attar was born in Mashhad, Razavi Khorasan Province, Iran and started learning filmmaking in the early 1980s. He was an active member of the Iranian Young Cinema Society In 2007 he conducted a research project to revise and improve the legal rights of authors and intellectual property owners, and presented it to the Iranian authorities.

Memberships

Activities

Selected filmography

As an actor

Awards

See also 
List of Iranian film directors

References

External links
 Official Website
 IYCS, Iranian Young Cinema Society
 Torino Film Festival
 Iranian Short Film

Iranian film directors
Iranian screenwriters
People from Mashhad
1968 births
Living people